Shanghai Innovative Research Center of Traditional Chinese Medicine (SIRC-TCM), also known as National Innovation Center of TCM Modernization in Shanghai, is a Chinese research institute focusing on herbal medicine discovery and natural product development. SIRC-TCM was founded in 2000 and is headquartered in Shanghai, China.

Products

 SAPHRON TCM Database
 Yuxintine (S111)

References

Traditional Chinese medicine
Medical research institutes in China